Andriy Yurin (born 20 January 1984 in Kiev Oblast, Soviet Union) is a Ukrainian race walker.

In 2009, he was found guilty of missing 3 doping tests between 2007 and 2008 and banned for 1 year.

Achievements

References

1984 births
Living people
Ukrainian male racewalkers
Ukrainian sportspeople in doping cases
Doping cases in athletics